Chris Taft (born March 10, 1985) is an American basketball player.

NCAA career
Chris Taft was born in Brooklyn, New York, and began his college career at the University of Pittsburgh after graduating from Xaverian High School in Brooklyn. Taft won the Big East Conference Rookie of the Year Award in his Freshman season and set the all-time Pittsburgh season record for field goals made as a freshman (162). Taft also earned Third Team All Big East Honors as a Freshman.

In 2004–05, Taft averaged 26.5 minutes per game, 13.3 points per game, 7.5 rebounds per game, and 1.7 blocks per game, and shot 58.5% from the field. After Pittsburgh suffered a loss to the University of the Pacific in the first round of the NCAA Tournament, Taft announced his entry into the 2005 NBA draft. Shortly after announcing his departure from Pittsburgh, Taft hired an agent and indefinitely lost his NCAA eligibility. Taft went to the Chicago Annual Predraft Camp which began his post-college career.

Professional career
Chris Taft entered the NBA draft as a projected first rounder, but he fell into the second round. Ultimately, he was picked by the Golden State Warriors 42nd overall, with the pick they got from the New Jersey Nets in exchange for Clifford Robinson.

Taft played in only 17 games in his rookie season as a result of back spasms that ended his season in early January. He had surgery in 2006 to repair a herniated disc and has yet to return to the court in a professional game. In his limited playing time, Chris averaged 2.8 points and 2.1 rebounds in 8.5 minutes per game.

His two major career games consist of Golden State's game against the Chicago Bulls on November 9, 2005, where Taft scored 7 points in 19 minutes, and Golden State's game against the Atlanta Hawks on November 2, where he had another professional career high of three blocks.

Taft was unable to play during the 2006–07 NBA preseason due to recurring back spasms and inflammation. On October 27, 2006, he was waived by the Warriors and became a free agent.

In November 2011, Taft was selected by the Springfield Armor in the fourth round of the NBA D-League Draft.

In August 2012, Chris Taft signed a contract to play in Finland with Korihait.
In December Korihait release Taft, because of health reasons.

References

External links

Finnish League profile

1985 births
Living people
African-American basketball players
American expatriate basketball people in Finland
Basketball players from New York City
Golden State Warriors draft picks
Golden State Warriors players
Parade High School All-Americans (boys' basketball)
Pittsburgh Panthers men's basketball players
Power forwards (basketball)
Rio Grande Valley Vipers players
Sportspeople from Brooklyn
Xaverian High School alumni
American men's basketball players
21st-century African-American sportspeople
20th-century African-American people